The Sony α5000 (model ILCE-5000), is a rangefinder-styled digital mirrorless system camera announced by Sony on 7 January 2014. Since it includes near field communication and Wi-Fi, Sony billed it as "the world's lightest interchangeable lens camera" with Wi-Fi. It has been succeeded by the Sony α5100.

See also
List of Sony E-mount cameras
Sony α6000

References

Live-preview digital cameras
Cameras introduced in 2014
α5000